Prospect Lake may refer to:

Prospect Lake (British Columbia), a small lake and neighbourhood in Saanich, British Columbia, Canada
Prospect Lake (Colorado), a small lake and neighborhood in Colorado Springs, Colorado
Prospect Reservoir, a dam-created lake in Prospect, Sydney, Australia
Prospect Lake, a lake in Prospect Park, Brooklyn, New York